Clayland Maffitt Touchstone (January 24, 1903 – April 28, 1949) was a professional baseball player.  He was a right-handed pitcher over parts of three seasons (1928–29, 1945) with the Boston Braves and Chicago White Sox.  For his career, he did not record a decision and compiled a 6.53 earned run average with six strikeouts in 20⅔ innings pitched.

He was born in Moore (now Prospect Park), Pennsylvania and died in Beaumont, Texas at the age of 46.

External links

1903 births
1949 deaths
Boston Braves players
Chicago White Sox players
Major League Baseball pitchers
Baseball players from Pennsylvania
Minor league baseball managers
Waterbury Brasscos players
Providence Grays (minor league) players
Birmingham Barons players
Newark Bears (IL) players
Memphis Chickasaws players
Oklahoma City Indians players
Dallas Rebels players